Nevin Markwart (born December 9, 1964) is a Canadian former professional ice hockey player who played 309 games in the National Hockey League.  He played for the Boston Bruins and Calgary Flames between 1983 and 1992. He was selected in first round, 21st overall, by the Bruins in the 1983 NHL Entry Draft. He was born in Toronto, Ontario, but grew up in Regina, Saskatchewan.

His mother named him after former Toronto Maple Leafs forward Bob Nevin, who had been traded to the New York Rangers earlier in the year. Markwart graduated from Luther College in Regina, Saskatchewan, in 1982.

Career statistics

Regular season and playoffs

References

External links 
 

1964 births
Living people
Boston Bruins draft picks
Boston Bruins players
Calgary Flames players
Canadian ice hockey left wingers
EHC Biel players
Hershey Bears players
Ice hockey people from Saskatchewan
Maine Mariners players
Moncton Golden Flames players
National Hockey League first-round draft picks
Regina Blues players
Regina Pats players
Sportspeople from Regina, Saskatchewan
Ice hockey people from Toronto
Springfield Indians players